Triplophysa polyfasciata is a species of ray-finned fish in the genus Triplophysa.

Footnotes 
 

P
Taxa named by Ding Rui-Hua
Fish described in 1996